The 2016 League 1, known as the Kingstone Press League 1 for sponsorship reasons, was a semi-professional rugby league football competition played in England, the third tier of the sport in the country.

The 2016 League 1 season was expanded to 15 teams with Toulouse Olympique rejoining the British game. At the end of the weekly rounds the top 8 teams played each other once more in the League 1 Super 8s after which the top 5 teams competed in the play-offs. The bottom 7 teams played each other once more with the top two teams competing for the inaugural League 1 Shield.

Teams

*capacity for rugby league games may differ from official stadium capacity.

Standings

Regular season

(Q) = Qualified for Play-offs
(S) = Secured spot in 2017 Championship

Super 8s

(Q) = Qualified for Play-offs

League 1 Shield

Playoffs
Promotion Final

 Rochdale Hornets are promoted to the Championship.

Playoffs

 Toulouse Olympique are promoted to the Championship.

References

External links
Official Website

RFL League 1
2016 in English rugby league
2016 in Welsh rugby league
2016 in French rugby league